Mick Lombardi (born October 1, 1988) is an American football coach who is the offensive coordinator for the Las Vegas Raiders of the National Football League (NFL). He previously served as an assistant coach for the New England Patriots, New York Jets and San Francisco 49ers.

Coaching career

Fordham
Lombardi began his coaching career at his alma mater, working as a coaching assistant for the Fordham Rams.

New England Patriots
In 2011, Lombardi began his NFL career with the New England Patriots as a scouting assistant. He was part of the Patriots roster that made it to Super Bowl XLVI in 2011.

San Francisco 49ers
In 2013, Lombardi was hired by the San Francisco 49ers as their assistant to the head coach under head coach Jim Harbaugh. In 2014, Lombardi was named as an offensive assistant. In 2015, he was retained under head coach Jim Tomsula as a defensive assistant. In 2016, Lombardi was retained under head coach Chip Kelly as an offensive quality control coach.

New York Jets
In 2017, Lombardi was hired by the New York Jets as an offensive assistant. In 2018, he was promoted to assistant quarterbacks coach.

New England Patriots (second stint)
In 2019, Lombardi was re-hired by the New England Patriots as their assistant quarterbacks coach. In 2020, Lombardi was promoted to wide receivers coach.

Las Vegas Raiders
On February 12, 2022, Lombardi was hired by the Las Vegas Raiders as their offensive coordinator under head coach Josh McDaniels.

Personal life
Lombardi and his wife, Michelle, have two sons. 

He is the son of former NFL executive Michael Lombardi, who last served as the general manager of the Cleveland Browns from 2013 to 2014.

References

External links 
 New England Patriots profile

1988 births
Living people
Coaches of American football from New Jersey
Fordham Rams football coaches
Fordham University alumni
Las Vegas Raiders coaches
National Football League offensive coordinators
New England Patriots coaches
New York Jets coaches
People from Ocean City, New Jersey
San Francisco 49ers coaches
Sportspeople from Cape May County, New Jersey